Erwin Oskar Ding-Schuler (September 19, 1912 – August 11, 1945) was a German surgeon and an officer in the Waffen-SS who attained the rank of Sturmbannführer (Major). He is notable for having performed experiments on inmates of the Buchenwald concentration camp.

Ding-Schuler joined the NSDAP in 1932 and the SS in 1936.  In 1937, he received his degree and passed his second state exam in medicine.  An author of scientific publications, in 1939 he became camp physician at Buchenwald and head of the division for spotted fever and viral research of the Waffen-SS Hygiene Institute in Weimar-Buchenwald. In July 1939, Ding-Schuler killed the pastor Paul Schneider with an overdose of g-Strophanthin. Schneider was later venerated as a martyr.
He conducted extensive medical experiments on some 1,000 inmates, many of whom lost their lives, in Experimental Station Block 46, using various poisons as well as infective agents for spotted fever, yellow fever, smallpox, typhus, and cholera.

Ding-Schuler was arrested by U.S. troops on 25 April 1945. He committed suicide on 11 August 1945.

See also
 Eugen Kogon

References

1912 births
1945 suicides
People from Bitterfeld-Wolfen
People from the Province of Saxony
SS-Sturmbannführer
Recipients of the Iron Cross (1939)
People indicted for war crimes
Physicians in the Nazi Party
Nazi human subject research
Buchenwald concentration camp personnel
Nazis who committed suicide in Germany
Nazis who committed suicide in prison custody
Waffen-SS personnel